The Central Utah Correctional Facility (CUCF, also known as the Central Utah Correctional Facility - Gunnison Prison) is a prison in Gunnison, Utah, United States, that is one of two prisons managed by the Utah Department of Corrections' Division of Institutional Operations. It's also death row for women in Utah.

Description
The prison was completed in 1990 and has a capacity for 1,125 prisoners.

CUCF is composed of two main housing units: Henry and Boulder. Henry is broken up into four sections - Aspen, Birch, Cedar, and Dogwood (also called "SMU" for "Special Management Unit"). Boulder is divided into three buildings - Elm, Fir, Gale and Hickory. Aspen, Birch and Cedar house regular population inmates. Dogwood (SMU) is a short term housing unit intended for those in transport, those waiting to be moved into other sections, and those being punished. Elm houses some college students, but also contains "lock-down", or punishment, sections. Fir houses inmates who are either enrolled in or are waiting to begin the in-patient substance abuse treatment program "HOPE" (Helping Offenders Parole Effectively). Gale houses inmates who are part of the STRIVE (Success through Responsibility, Integrity, Values and Effort). Hickory is controlled, maximum security unit housing "level two" inmates.

The prison is used to house up to maximum security types of inmates. Unlike the Utah State Correctional Facility located in Salt Lake City, CUCF is located in a rural part of the state, and thus more isolated from the main population centers of Utah. The prison underwent an expansion concluding in 2008, adding 192 beds in the Hickory unit to meet the growing needs of Utah's offender population.

Notable inmates

See also

 List of Utah state prisons

References

External links

 

Prisons in Utah
Buildings and structures in Sanpete County, Utah
Capital punishment in Utah
1990 establishments in Utah